2017–18 in Swedish bandy was a bandy season starting in August 2017 and ending in July 2018.

Honours

Men's bandy

Official titles

Competitions

Women's bandy

Official titles

Competitions

Promotions, relegations and qualifications

Promotions

Relegations

Domestic results

Men's bandy

2017–18 Elitserien

National teams

Sweden national bandy team

2018 Bandy World Championship

Sweden women's national bandy team

2018 Women's Bandy World Championship

See also
 2017–18 Elitserien (bandy)
 Swedish bandy league system

References

Seasons in Swedish bandy
Bandy
Bandy
Sweden
Sweden